Debbie Farhat (born September 27, 1954) is a former member of the Michigan House of Representatives.

Early life
Farhat was born on September 27, 1954 in Muskegon, Michigan.

Education
Farhat graduated from Muskegon Catholic Central High School. Farhat then graduated from Central Michigan University with a Bachelor of Fine Arts in broadcasting.

Career
On November 4, 1986, Farhat was elected to the Michigan House of Representatives where she represented the 97th district from January 14, 1987 to 1988. She was not re-elected in 1988.

Personal life
Farhat is Catholic.

References

Living people
1954 births
Catholics from Michigan
People from Muskegon, Michigan
Central Michigan University alumni
Women state legislators in Michigan
Democratic Party members of the Michigan House of Representatives
20th-century American politicians
21st-century American women
20th-century American women politicians